The Deadly Joker is a 1963 mystery novel by the Anglo-Irish writer Cecil Day-Lewis, under his pen name of Nicholas Blake. It was one of four stand-alone novels he wrote under the name alongside the Nigel Strangeways detective novels. It is unusual for the author for being written in a first person narrative from the prospective of the protagonist John Waterson.

Synopsis
A man and his younger wife settle in the English countryside, but find the village is teeming with tensions. Things come to a head when one of the inhabitants is killed during a flower show.

References

Bibliography
 Bargainnier, Earl F. Twelve Englishmen of Mystery. Popular Press, 1984.
 Reilly, John M. Twentieth Century Crime & Mystery Writers. Springer, 2015.
 Stanford, Peter. C Day-Lewis: A Life. A&C Black, 2007.

1963 British novels
Novels by Cecil Day-Lewis
British mystery novels
British thriller novels
Collins Crime Club books
Novels set in England